The fire services in the United Kingdom use motorcycles (fire bikes) in various roles. A number of fire and rescue services around the UK use fire bikes to deliver road safety messages. From 2005, Merseyside fire service deployed a bike in an automatic alarm response role, and from 2007 they have used two quad-bikes for public information campaigns. In 2010 Merseyside became the first fire service in the UK to use fire bikes as an actual fire appliance, to be used to fight small fires. Having been deployed in a six-month trial, if found successful they could be deployed to other services nationally.

Merseyside

Alarm response bike
The Merseyside Fire and Rescue Service have been using bikes since 2005. A 1300cc Honda pan-European bike is used in busy times during the day to quickly attend automated fire alarm incidents in Liverpool, ahead of main appliances, to assess situations at the premises. The bike is equipped with blue lights, emergency warning equipment, a first aid kit and an extinguisher, as well as an LED matrix sign. The bike was introduced due to rising congestion, and because "virtually all" of calls, comprising 800 in city centre commercial areas, 6,000 overall, were false alarms.

Quad-bikes
In 2007, the Merseyside service also introduced two Honda quad-bikes to assist in reducing and preventing anti-social behaviour fires in areas that are used for public recreation, by promoting public awareness and engaging with young people. The service was also to investigate if they could be used operationally to fight woodland or grass fires.

Hose-equipped bikes
On 23 July 2010, it was announced the first hose-equipped fire bikes were to be used in the United Kingdom. Other forces have attended a demonstration of the bikes in Merseyside.

The bikes will be sent to fires instead of fire appliances when fires are not deemed a threat to people or buildings, thereby freeing up appliances for use elsewhere. The equipment on one bike can fight a fire for two to three minutes, but can extinguish a car fire in around 20 seconds. The bikes will be sent to incidents of anti-social rubbish fires in skips or wheelie bins, which account for 60% of the force's fire call outs.

The riders use a bespoke designed suit which is both fire-protective and suitable for motorcycle riding, although the rider still has to switch between two helmets, a motorcycle helmet and a firefighter's helmet. The bikes cost about £30,000 to buy and equip. The 1,200cc machines are made by BMW Motorrad.

Road safety bikes

A number of UK fire services operate fire bikes to promote safe motorcycle riding. Painted in the highly visible fire service markings and colour schemes, and ridden by police-trained firefighters, they are used in road safety events such as the BikeSafe initiative, or taken to motorcycle events and popular biker gathering places, to engage with bike riders, on the theory that firefighters, rather than the police, are seen as more approachable by bike riders, and have specific knowledge of motorbike safety, having attended many motorcycle accidents.

In this education role, the West Sussex service operates two Triumph machines, while the North Wales service use a Yamaha FJR1300. In the Kent service, they use a high-profile superbike as their fire bike, a Honda Fireblade, which has been sent to such events as the British Superbike Championship at Brands Hatch Kent Fire Bike Team's aims are, whilst working both independently and in conjunction with partnership agencies including Kent Police, Highways Agency, KMT Road Safety org and SE Ambulance, to raise awareness of advanced training opportunities for bikers, raise awareness of other road users to the vulnerability of bikers, highlight importance of correct attitude and equipment for bikers and represent biking and motorcyclists to the rest of the non biking public.

Northumberland medic and safety bike
The Northumberland Fire and Rescue Service use a BMW R1150 as their fire bike. It was originally introduced as just a road safety bike, but with the later addition of an automated external defibrillator (AED) and trauma care kit, it can now also be used as a response vehicle for road traffic accidents.

See also
 Fire appliances in the United Kingdom
 Geography of firefighting
 Motorcycle ambulance
 Police motorcycle

References

External links

Fire and rescue in the United Kingdom
Fire service vehicles
Fire
Vehicles of the United Kingdom